Vladimir Tsvetkov was a Bulgarian footballer. He played in two matches for the Bulgaria national football team in 1927. He was also part of Bulgaria's squad for the football tournament at the 1924 Summer Olympics, but he did not play in any matches.

References

External links
 

Year of birth missing
Year of death missing
Bulgarian footballers
Bulgaria international footballers
Place of birth missing
Association football forwards
PFC Slavia Sofia players